For the Young at Heart was Perry Como's seventh RCA Victor 12" long-play album, released in 1960. For The Young At Heart was a concept album with all the songs having "Young" in their title. It is also the first Perry Como album produced by Hugo & Luigi.

The producers Hugo Peretti and Luigi Creatore banned strings from the studio, instead employing a nine-piece horn section, a prominent rhythm section with much guitar, and an ever-present chorus. The arrangements by O.B. Masingill, although uncredited, are quite unique, bright and uptempo with a touch of swing.

Track listing

References

External links
Perry Como Discography

Perry Como albums
1960 albums
Albums produced by Hugo & Luigi
RCA Victor albums